Western Brook Pond is a Canadian fjord or lake located in Gros Morne National Park on the west coast of the island of Newfoundland. It is in the Long Range Mountains, the most northern section of the Appalachian Mountains.

After the glaciers melted, the land rebounded and the fjord was cut off from the sea. Salty water was eventually flushed from the fjord leaving it fresh. The catchment area is composed of igneous rock with relatively thin soil, so the waters feeding Western Brook Pond are low in nutrients and the lake is classified as ultraoligotrophic. It is fed by Stag Brook at the extreme eastern end of the lake and by numerous waterfalls cascading from the plateau above.

The lake is accessible by a moderate-easy  hiking trail over coastal bogs and low limestone ridges. Two tour boats, one with a capacity of 70 passengers and the other 90 passengers, cruise the lake from June to mid-October. The lake waters are pristine, having had very little impact from human activities. The tour boat operators had to undergo special certification to ensure that their operations would have minimal impact on the environment.

In the early part of the 20th century, a part of the surrounding cliff broke off and fell into the lake, causing a  tsunami.

See also
List of fjords in Canada

References

Fjords of Newfoundland and Labrador
Lakes of Newfoundland and Labrador